The Philippine Arena is the world's largest indoor arena. It is a multipurpose indoor arena with a maximum seating capacity of 55,000 at Ciudad de Victoria, a 140-hectare tourism enterprise zone in Bocaue and Santa Maria, Bulacan, Philippines about 30 kilometers north of Manila. It is one of the centerpieces of the many centennial projects of the Iglesia ni Cristo (INC) for their centennial celebration on July 27, 2014. The legal owner of the arena is the INC's educational institution, New Era University.

History

Construction
In 2011, Korean firm, Hanwha Engineering and Construction won the contract to manage the construction of the Philippine Arena. Hanwha outbested bids from Filipino firm, EEI Corporation an done on August 17, 2011. Hanwha announced that it had completed the construction of the indoor arena on May 30, 2014. The venue was not formally inaugurated until almost two months later.

Inauguration
The Philippine Arena, along with Ciudad de Victoria was officially inaugurated on July 21, 2014. Then-Philippine President Benigno Aquino III and Iglesia ni Cristo Executive Minister Eduardo Manalo unveiled the marker of Ciudad de Victoria.

Building details

Concept
The initial design concept of the Philippine arena is inspired by the narra tree, the mother tree of the Philippines, and the root of the banyan tree. The roof was inspired by that of a Nipa Hut.

Architecture
Populous, a global mega-architecture firm, designed the arena through their office in Brisbane, Australia. The official website of the sports facility describe's the structure's architectural style as Modernist. The arena has been master planned to enable at least 50,000 people to gather inside the building and a further 50,000 to gather at a ‘live site’ or plaza outside to share in major events. The seating bowl of the arena is a one-sided bowl and is partitioned into two parts, the upper and the lower bowl each with approximately 25,000 seating capacity. The lower bowl is the most used part of the building and the architectural design allows for easy separation of the lower bowl from the upper tier, by curtaining with acoustic and thermal properties. A retractable seating of 2,000 people capacity is also installed behind the stage which is used by the choir of the Iglesia ni Cristo for events of the church.

The seating layout of the arena is different from that of a standard arena where the stage is at the middle and is surrounded by seats. The seating of the arena closely resembles that of a Greek amphitheater, built in a semi-circle with the seats at the sides and front of the arena stage. The seatings are divided into three sections. Each of the sections are colored green, white and red: the colors of the Iglesia ni Cristo flag.

The arena has 4 floors or levels. Level 1 is the stage level, Level 2 is the main access level open to the general viewing public, Level 3 is the VIP area which also houses conference rooms with views facing the main plaza outside the indoor arena building and Level 4 is the upper concourse.

Furthermore, contractor Hanwha hired their own architecture firm, Haeanh Architects for the project.

Structure

The roof was made as a separate unit to reduce burden on the arena with extra load. About a third of the dead load of the building was designed for earthquake loads. The building was also divided into multiple structures to strengthen the arena's earthquake resistance.

Landscape
PWP Landscape Architecture, the firm who landscaped the National September 11 Memorial & Museum, designed the landscape for the arena and the whole complex of Ciudad de Victoria. For the arena, a series of outdoor plazas, gardens and performance venues form the setting for the development including: The North and South Arrival Plazas, The Promontory Plaza, The Great Stairs, and Ciudad de Victoria Plaza that are all related to each other with two cross axes (N-S and E-W) that intersect at the Promontory Plaza.

Uses

The arena holds not only major church gatherings of the Iglesia ni Cristo, but also operates as a multi-use sports and concert venue, capable of holding a range of events from boxing and basketball to live music performances, but no association football or field events due to its limited size. There is clear "line of sight" for every seat from each tier, even for various arena configurations such as church ceremonies, boxing, tennis, concerts or indoor gymnastics. The Iglesia ni Cristo allows non-Iglesia tenants to use the arena. The church reserves the right to disallow activities which it sees violate its religious principles, which include gambling-related events and cockfighting.

Notable events

In popular media
The Philippine Arena was featured in a documentary called Man Made Marvels: Quake Proof. It aired on December 25, 2013, on Discovery Channel and focused on making structures in the Philippines more safe from natural disasters in general such as earthquake and typhoons.

Reception
On July 27, 2014, Guinness World Records recognized the arena as the largest mixed-use indoor theater.

Notes

See also
 Iglesia ni Cristo
 Mall of Asia Arena
 Smart Araneta Coliseum
 Philippines–Australia basketball brawl

References

External links
 
 

Indoor arenas in the Philippines
Iglesia ni Cristo
Basketball venues in the Philippines
Buildings and structures in Bulacan
Sports in Bulacan
Sports venues completed in 2014
2014 establishments in the Philippines
Modernist architecture in the Philippines